HMS Arun is the name of two of Royal Navy vessels, named after the English River Arun:

 , a  built by Cammell Laird, Birkenhead, launched in 1903 and completed later that year.  The ship was sold for scrap in 1920. 
The vessel was sold to the Brazilian Navy in 1998, and renamed successively Hercules, Jose Bonifacio and Babitonga.

References
 

Royal Navy ship names